The 2007 Indian Ocean Island Games commonly known as Les septieme Jeux des iles de L'Ocean Indien in French was the 7th edition of the competition, held in Antananarivo, Madagascar. The last edition was held in 2003 in Mauritius. The next edition took place in  Seychelles in 2011. It was the second time Madagascar organized these games after the 1990 Indian Ocean Islands Games.   The mascot of the games was a ravenala plant (which is a symbol of Madagascar) named Ravi

Teams participated
7 islands, all located in the Indian Ocean, participated in the 2007 Indian Ocean Island Games.

Sports

Medal table

General table

References

Sources
https://web.archive.org/web/20110904022816/http://www.jioi2007.mg/
https://web.archive.org/web/20120326173805/http://www.jioi2007.mg/site_global/mascotte.php
https://web.archive.org/web/20120326173838/http://www.jioi2007.mg/site_global/classpardiscipline.php
https://web.archive.org/web/20120326173819/http://www.jioi2007.mg/site_global/classement.php

External links
 Official website

2007
2007 in multi-sport events
2007 in Malagasy sport
2007